Calliostoma zietzi, common name the Zietz top shell, is a species of sea snail, a marine gastropod mollusk in the family Calliostomatidae.

Some authors place this taxon in the subgenus Calliostoma (Fautor) .

Description
The height of the shell attains 8 mm.

Distribution
This marine species occurs off Victoria to Western Australia; off Tasmania.

References

 Cotton, B.C. (1959). South Australian Mollusca. Archaeogastropoda. Adelaide: Govt. Printer. pp. 1–449.
 Wilson, B. (1993). Australian Marine Shells. Prosobranch Gastropods. Kallaroo, WA : Odyssey Publishing. Vol.1 1st Edn pp. 1–408

External links
 Verco, Notes on South Australian Mollusca with descriptions of new species, part II; Transactions and proceedings and report of the Royal Society of South Australia,  v 29 (1905)

zietzi
Gastropods described in 1905